The Korean National Youth Association abbreviated as Jokcheong was a fascist, extreme right-wing group founded on October 9, 1946 under the catchphrase 'national branch, national geography', and led by Lee Beom-seok. KNYA had an ideology that intersected fascism and resistance nationalism, which also embraced left-wing youth and was described as a "Third Way".

History

Foundation 
The Association was a fascist youth group organized by Lee Beom-seok, who was fully sponsored by the U.S. military government in October 1946. It has organized more than 1 million young people, focusing on training young people, and non-political, non-military and non-religious groups. Lee Beom-Seok showed strong nationalist tendencies and actively recruited left-wing figures. The Association served as the basis for Lee's political activities and was disbanded under Rhee's direction in 1949, but later remained in the form of a "congress system," playing a big role in the establishment of the Liberal Party.

Configuration 
It was formed in October 1946 by Lee Beom-seok as the parent of the youth movement to succeed the tradition of national spirit. After Rhee(first president of South Korea) came into power, it was merged into the Korean National Youth Association (The abbreviation is called Jokcheong 族靑) and disbanded following the consolidation of youth groups.

Doctrine 
The doctrine of the Korean National Youth Association was called "Danjisamchik (團旨三則). It meant that "We are determined to fulfill the mission of young people under the ideology of national and national levels by invoking the spirit of the nation". The strove to rally the capabilities of the nation in the spirit of national independence and international co-existence beyond the sect. They said "We aim to face the reality and look to the great place, and to start with the familiar and to give a youthful sense of purity to the founding fathers"

Activation 
The Korean National Youth Association set up a training center in Suwon in November 1946 with the support of the U.S. military government and began a one-month training program for the youth. At that time, the number of applicants for training reached 20,000. 200 of them were selected, and the first batch of trainees was announced in December 1946. From the 7th grade, female senior trainees were also admitted, and the training was divided into five categories: mental, physical, theory, life, and practical departments. In the theory section, more than 20 people, including Jeong In-bo, Ahn Ho-sang, Bae Sung-ryong, and Sulin, take the lecture for a week and 12 hours, and Lee Beom-seok himself worked on the realization of the reality of his country and ways of a new youth movement, revolutionary views of life, revolutionary ethnicity, and the old-country Salvation Movement.

The Korean Youth Association has transformed the characteristics of young people, namely their vitality, passion, desire to seek out, self-consciousness, experience, and purity into the productive forces of youth movement and struggle. Under Lee Beom-seok's leadership, the trainees formed a powerful nationwide organization by returning to their respective villages and affiliated organizations to form and strengthen the sub-organization of the Jokcheong branch. With the expansion of the organization, there has been strong criticism from political circles and some in society that it is an extension of the activities of the Liberation Army, an autocratic movement group, and even a mercenary organization.

When the Korean National Youth Association was formed in December 1951 as a new party, it held an establishment ceremony at Dong-A Theater in Busan and adopted the platform and constitution, resulting in the creation of two anti-communist parties of the same name. It is the so-called Liberal Party. The pro-opposition Liberal Party was defeated by representative Rhee Syng-man as its presidential candidate, and Vice President Lee Beom-seok was defeated, and independent candidate Ham Tae-young was elected in May 1952.

The Liberal Party's national convention was supposed to convene within 40 days of the government's election, but the Jokcheong faction was engulfed in unprecedented political infighting as the party was expected to make contributions based on the outcome of the election. The genealogy criticized those who were uncooperative in the elections while launching attacks outside the party. At that time, he accused Prime Minister Chang Taek-sang and Interior Minister Kim Tae-sun of violating the election law while even declaring a political struggle.

Kim Tae-sun resigned as Seoul's special mayor after losing his job while Chang Taek-sang stepped down as prime minister after being embroiled in a political maneuver called "the high-profile case". A national convention led by the Jokcheong faction for purging after the political and non-government elections was held in Daejeon in May 1953. It was also said that the contest was the culmination of a religious struggle within the Liberal Party, which led to the self-destruction of the Korean National Youth Association at that time.

Rhee released a statement on the elimination of the Jokcheong faction in September of the same year. In the statement, called "special division," Rhee made an unprecedented, tough decision: "There are those in the Liberal Party who are mainly the old generation of the people, who are antagonizing my intentions and harming the unity of the party and putting the spirit of the whole nation at risk, and this should be purged even if they suffer the pain of being a mere".

At the same time, Lee Beom-seok decided on the principle of integration into the Great Korean Young Adults Association and selected five representatives from the Liberal Party. Thus, the following year, in January 1954, the association was finally disbanded, saying, "The merits and demerits of our youth movement will be duly assessed when the Korean people revive".

Backgrounds 
Lee Beom-seok found it most urgent to organize and train young people as the rebel forces of the new country that was liberated from Japanese colonial rule, and created the "congress" with the support of the U.S. military government.

In 1946, the U.S. military secretly provided about $5 million in U.S. military equipment and dispatched a U.S. colonel to assist in the formation of the Jokcheong region as a training consultant, thinking that it was necessary to use the youth organization.

To get rid of the problem, the funds came from the MacArthur Command in Tokyo, Japan, not from the military government. McArthur's command provided everything from vehicle support to uniforms. The Ahn Ho-sang provided the rationale for the weasel.

The Jokcheong had formed a board of directors with Kim Hwal-ran, Baek Nak-jun, Choi Gyu-dong, and Hyun Sang-yoon, and established a center headquarters for the Jokcheong branch in the former Japanese Army Hospital building in Suwon, Gyeonggi Province. About 70,000 people were secretly trained at the Suwon training center to avoid Soviet protests. The purpose of education was to become an army in the future. Many of these individuals were incorporated into the armed forces.

The Jokcheong was founded on Oct. 9, 1946, but the number increased to 300,000 in November 1947, 1.15 million in August 1948 and 1.2 million in the fall of 1948. In April 1947, when Ji Cheong-cheon, commander of the Korean Liberation Army, returned to Korea and formed the Daedong Youth Corps, he also asked for the merge, but Lee refused to join and entered into a rivalry with the Daedong Youth Corps.

Critics said that Jokcheong is a nationalistic and extremely totalitarian idea.

In the general elections of the Constitutional Council of Korea on May 10, 1948, six people were elected on behalf of the Jokcheong government, and later became powerful enough to form a floor negotiation group. However, the consolidation of youth groups was promoted by President Rhee Syng-man's order to unify all youth organizations from November 1948, and Jokcheong was eventually absorbed by the Great Korean Young Adults Association in 1949 after resistance.

As Lee Beom-seok resisted such a step-by-step proposal to join Rhee's order in the process of absorption with the Great Korean Young Adults Association, Rhee issued a statement on January 5, 1949, and officially called for the dissolution of the Jokcheong Office. On January 20, 1949, the Jokcheong was officially disbanded and Lee Beom-seok was dismissed as defense minister.

However, even after the disbandment, the former members of Jokcheong formed a force called the "family Cheonggye" to play a central role in the process of creating a Liberal party, but in December 1953, Lee Beom-seok and his followers were expelled from the Liberal Party.

See also 
 Conservative Revolution
 Fascism in Asia
 Ilminism

References 

1946 establishments in Korea
Anti-capitalist political parties
Anti-imperialism in Korea
Anti-Japanese sentiment in South Korea
Far-right politics in South Korea
Fascism in South Korea
Identity politics in Korea
Ilminist parties
Korean politicians
National conservatism
Military-related organizations
Military training facilities
Neo-fascist parties
Right-wing anti-capitalism
Syncretic political movements
Third Position